ELO 2 is the second studio album by the Electric Light Orchestra (ELO), released in 1973. In the US, the album was released as Electric Light Orchestra II. It was the band's last album to be released by the Harvest label, the last (in the UK) on which the band used the definite article The in their name, and the one that introduced their abbreviated name 'ELO'.

Background and recording
The album was originally to be titled The Lost Planet, but that concept was quietly dropped. During the initial recording sessions, Roy Wood left the band and formed Wizzard in June 1972, taking Bill Hunt and touring cellist Hugh McDowell with him. Although uncredited at the time, Wood performed on two tracks, playing cello and bass on "In Old England Town" and "From the Sun to the World". Classically trained cellist Colin Walker replaced Wood, and Wilfred Gibson played violin. Richard Tandy made his ELO studio debut on this album, playing keyboards; he had earlier performed live with the original lineup alongside Wood, Gibson, co-frontman Jeff Lynne, drummer Bev Bevan and cellist Mike Edwards, playing bass (and in TV appearances with the Move playing guitar). Bassist and vocalist Mike de Albuquerque also made his ELO studio debut on the album. All five pieces are longer than standard rock songs, and feature multi-layered orchestral instruments that create a dense, complex sound.

Release

Along with its predecessor, ELO 2 is the least commercial-sounding album the band released, although it reached the British Top 40 album chart, whereas its more concise follow-up, On the Third Day, did not. An edit of "Roll Over Beethoven" was a top 10 hit in Britain and received radio airplay in America also. In 2006 the album was remastered and expanded in the US, with a slightly different running order to the UK 2003 EMI version, with both versions sharing the same Hipgnosis album art for the first time.

The British and American sleeves differed, as did the title; in the UK it was released in a gatefold sleeve titled ELO 2 with a painting of a light bulb travelling through space with the wording 'ELO2' on the base of the bulb, while in the US the cover featured a more ornate light bulb against a night sky and was titled Electric Light Orchestra II. For reasons unknown, "Roll Over Beethoven" was slightly edited in length compared with its US counterpart. Track 2 "Momma" was Americanised to "Mama" for the US release. An instrumental version of "In Old England Town", the opening track, became the B-side to the single "Showdown". The album contains the band's longest track, the anti-war song "Kuiama".

Original track listing

ELO 2 (First Light Series) 

ELO 2 (First light Series) is an expanded 30th Anniversary edition of Electric Light Orchestra's second album.

The second in the EMI First Light Series released in 2003 to mark the album's 30th anniversary. The first five tracks comprise the original ELO 2 album. After ELO had completed and released ELO 2, the band began recording new material for the third album. Tracks 6-8 on disc two were recorded in February 1973, and features original Move lead singer Carl Wayne. Tracks 9-12 on disc one were recorded in April 1973 and features glam rock superstar Marc Bolan, who was also recording at AIR Studios at that time, on double lead guitar on tracks 10–12. The band re-recorded two of these songs for the third album because of ELO's label change in the UK before it was released. Tracks 6-8 on disc one and track 5 on disc two were recorded in June 1973, with track 6 becoming a hit single in the UK. The second disc utilises the original album's working title The Lost Planet, and features various live recordings, outtakes and rarities, in addition to the songs recorded with Carl Wayne.

All songs written by Jeff Lynne except where noted.

Tracks 9-13 previously unreleased.

Lead vocals on tracks 6-8 by Carl Wayne.
BBC Session material recorded at BBC Langham Studio 1, 1 November 1972.

Personnel
Personnel according to the gatefold.
Jeff Lynne – lead vocals, guitars, Moog synthesizer
Bev Bevan – drums, percussion
Richard Tandy – piano, harmonium, Moog synthesizer, guitar, backing vocals
Mike de Albuquerque – bass, backing vocals (on tracks 2, 3, and 5)
Mike Edwards – cello
Wilf Gibson – violin
Colin Walker – cello (on tracks 2, 3, and 5)
Roy Wood – bass, cello (on tracks 1 and 4)

Unconfirmed musicians
Hugh McDowell – possible cello (on tracks 1 and 4)
Bill Hunt – French horn (track 4), possible keyboards (track 1)

Additional personnel
Marc Bolan – guitar on ELO 2 tracks 10–12
Carl Wayne – lead vocals on The Lost Planet tracks 6–8

Production
Jeff Lynne – producer
Marty Evans – photography
Al Vandenburg – photography
Mike Salisbury – art direction
Lloyd Ziff – design

Chart positions

Release history

References

Electric Light Orchestra albums
1973 albums
Albums produced by Jeff Lynne
Albums with cover art by Hipgnosis
Harvest Records albums
United Artists Records albums
Jet Records albums
Albums recorded at AIR Studios